The women's junior road race of the 2022 UCI Road World Championships was a cycling event that took place on 23 September 2022 in Wollongong, Australia.

Final classification

References

Women's junior road race
UCI Road World Championships – Women's junior road race
2022 in women's road cycling